Everett Area School District is a small, rural, public school district in Bedford County, Pennsylvania. It serves a rural region and encompasses the borough of Everett and the townships of West Providence, East Providence, Monroe, Southampton, and Mann. Everett Area School District encompasses  of southern Pennsylvania. According to 2000 federal census data, Everett Area School District served a resident population of 9,949. Per US Census Bureau data, the resident population declined to 9,704 in 2010. The educational attainment levels for the Everett Area School District population (25 years old and over) were 81.9% high school graduates and 11.6% college graduates. The district is one of the 500 public school districts of Pennsylvania.

According to the Pennsylvania Budget and Policy Center, 50.5% of the district's pupils lived at 185% or below the Federal Poverty level as shown by their eligibility for the federal free or reduced price school meal programs in 2012. In 2009, the district residents’ per capita income was $16,205, while the median family income was $35,435. In the Commonwealth, the median family income was $49,501  and the United States median family income was $49,445, in 2010. In Bedford County, the median household income was $40,249. By 2013, the median household income in the United States rose to $52,100.

Everett Area School District operates four schools: Breezewood Elementary School, Everett Area Elementary School, Everett Area Middle School and Everett Area High School. High school students can attend the Bedford County Technical Center for training in the construction trades or culinary arts as well as other careers.

Extracurriculars
Everett Area School District offers a wide variety of clubs, activities and an extensive sport program.

Sports
The school district operates:
Varsity

Boys
 Basketball - Class AA
 Baseball - Class AA
 Football - Class A
 Golf - Class AA
 Rifle - AAAA
 Soccer - Class A
 Softball - Class AA
 Track and field - Class AA
 Wrestling - Class AA

Girls
Basketball - AA
Cheer - AAAA
Golf - AA
Soccer (Fall) - A
Softball - AA
Track and field - AA
Volleyball - A

MiddleSchool Sports

Boys
Baseball
Basketball
Football
Soccer
Wrestling 

Girls
Basketball
Cheer
Softball
Volleyball

According to PIAA directory July 2015

References

External links
 Everett Area School District
 PIAA

School districts in Bedford County, Pennsylvania